The Dead Christ with Angels or Four Angels Lamenting the Dead Christ is an oil on panel painting by Rosso Fiorentino, executed c. 1525–1526, now in the Museum of Fine Arts in Boston.

Despite the discrepancy in the number of angels, the work is traditionally held to be the "canvas of a dead Christ supported by two angels" mentioned in Vasari's Lives of the Artists as produced for Leonardo Tornabuoni, Bishop of Sansepolcro, one of several Florentine prelates at Pope Clement VII's court. Vasari did not specify the work's intended destination.

It was probably still in the artist's studio at the time of the Sack of Rome before being entrusted to Maria Maddalena, a Florentine sister at the San Lorenzo in Colonna monastery.

References

Bibliography
  Antonio Natali, Rosso Fiorentino, Silvana Editore, Milano 2006. 
  Elisabetta Marchetti Letta, Pontormo, Rosso Fiorentino, Scala, Firenze 1994. 
 

Fiorentino
Paintings by Rosso Fiorentino
Paintings in the collection of the Museum of Fine Arts, Boston
1526 paintings
Angels in art